Radnor Hunt is the oldest continuous fox-hunting club in the United States recognized by the Masters of Foxhounds Association of North America.

Overview
Radnor Hunt was founded in 1883 in Pennsylvania. A property was purchased on the corner of Darby-Paoli and Roberts Roads in Newtown Township, Delaware County, Pennsylvania, and it became the club headquarters.

From its early days, it attracted members of prominent families from Philadelphia and the Philadelphia Main Line, also known as "Old Philadelphians". For example, Alexander Cassatt (1839–1906), the seventh president of the Pennsylvania Railroad (PRR), was a founding member. The first President was James Rawle of the J. G. Brill Company, and the first Master of Foxhounds was Horace B. Montgomery. Later, Samuel D. Riddle (1861–1951) joined the club.

In 1931, architect Arthur Ingersoll Meigs (1882-1956), who was a member of the hunt, restored the Gallagher Farm on Boot Road (now Providence Road) in White Horse, Pennsylvania as well as new stables and kennels. It became the new club headquarters.

The club is recognized by the Masters of Foxhounds Association of America. Memberships are cited in the Social Register.

Leadership
President: Janice Murdoch .
Vice President: J. Wesley Hardin.
Treasurer: Stephen E. Flynn II
Secretary: Jane Taylor.

Bibliography
Collin F. McNeil, Bright Hunting Morn: The 125th Anniversary of the Radnor Hunt (New York, New York: The Derrydale Press, 2009)

References

Fox hunting
1880s in Pennsylvania
Upper class culture in Pennsylvania